Arthur 'Art' Handy (born February 15, 1967) is an American politician and a Democratic member of the Rhode Island House of Representatives representing District 18 since January 2003.

Education
Handy earned his BA in Marine Affairs from the University of Miami.

Website
Handy's website has expired and is now a Chinese gambling website.

Elections
2012 Handy was challenged in the September 11, 2012, Democratic Primary, winning with 850 votes (65.8%) and won the three-way November 6, 2012, General election with 3,524 votes (62.7%) against Republican nominee Donald Gendron and Independent candidate Mark Stoutzenberger.
2002 With District 18 incumbent Democratic Representative Leon Tejada redistricted to District 11, Handy ran in the three-way September 10, 2002, Democratic Primary, winning with 1,124 votes (64.4%) and won the three-way November 5, 2002, General election with 2,567 votes (53.0%) against Republican nominee Robert Clarkin and Independent candidate James Sulanowski.
2004 Handy and returning 2002 Republican opponent Robert Clarkin were both unopposed for their September 14, 2004, primaries, setting up a rematch; Handy won the November 2, 2004, General election with 3,321 votes (57.6%) against Clarkin.
2006 Handy was unopposed for the September 12, 2006, Democratic Primary, winning with 1,175 votes and won the November 7, 2006, General election with 3,871 votes (74.2%) against Republican nominee Richard Nordlund.
2008 Handy and returning 2006 Republican challenger Richard Nordlund were both unopposed for their September 9, 2008, primaries, setting up a rematch; Handy won the November 4, 2008, General election with 4,076 votes (69.1%) against Nordlund.
2010 Handy was challenged in the September 23, 2010, Democratic Primary, winning with 931 votes (69.0%); returning 2006 and 2008 Republican challenger Nordlund was unopposed for his primary, setting up their third contest; Handy won the November 2, 2010, General election with 2,834 votes (65.0%) against Nordlund.

References

External links
Official page at the Rhode Island General Assembly
Campaign site

Arthur Handy at Ballotpedia
Arthur Handy at the National Institute on Money in State Politics

1967 births
Living people
Democratic Party members of the Rhode Island House of Representatives
Politicians from Cranston, Rhode Island
Politicians from Richmond, Virginia
University of Miami alumni
21st-century American politicians